John Aston may refer to:

Politicians
John Aston (fl. 1362–1391), MP for Leominster, Dartmouth and Barnstaple
John Aston (fl. 1388), MP for Leominster
John Aston (MP for Ludlow); see Ludlow

Sportspeople
John Aston Sr. (1921–2003), English footballer
John Aston Jr. (born 1947), English footballer
John Aston (cricketer) (1882–1951), Irish cricketer

Others
John Dastin (c. 1293–c. 1386), associated with Oriel College and worked at the court of cardinal Napoleon Orsini
John Aston (preacher) (fl. 1382), one of John Wycliffe's earliest followers
John Aston (knight banneret) (died 1523), a military character of great eminence in the during the reigns of Henry VII and Henry VIII
John Aston (statistician), British statistician, Chief Scientific Adviser at the Home Office

See also 
John Astin (born 1930), American actor 
John Ashton (actor) (born 1948), American actor
John de Aston (disambiguation)